Jungang-dong may refer to
Jungang-dong, Masanhappo-gu, an administrative dong of Masanhappo-gu, Changwon
Jungang-dong, Busan, an administrative dong of Jung-gu, Busan
Jungang-dong, Gyeongsan
Jungang-dong, Mungyeong
Jungang-dong, Yeongcheon
Jungang-dong, Pohang
Jungang-dong, Wonju
Jungang-dong, Yongin
Jungang-dong, Cheongju
Jungang-dong, Daejeon
Jungang-dong, Gwangju
Jungang-dong, Sokcho
Jungang-dong, Dongducheon
Jungang-dong, Naju
Jungang-dong, Incheon
Jungang-dong, Yeosu
Jungang-dong, Suncheon
Jungang-dong, Jecheon
Jungang-dong, Pyeongtaek
Jungang-dong, Iksan
Jungang-dong, Seongsan-gu
Jungang-dong, Yangsan
Jungang-dong, Osan
Jungang-dong, Mokpo
Jungang-dong, Gwacheon
Jungang-dong, Jinhae-gu
Jungang-dong, Jinju
Jungang-dong, Jeonju
Jungang-dong, Tongyeong
Jungang-dong, Gunsan
Jungang-dong, Seogwipo